Chest cancer is cancer anywhere in the chest.

Chest cancer may also refer to:

 Lung cancer, the most common form of cancer in the chest
 Male breast cancer, a euphemism used by people uncomfortable with the fact that all humans have breasts